Irwin M. Stelzer (born 22 May 1932) is an American economist
who is the U.S. economic and business columnist for The Sunday Times in the United Kingdom and was for The Courier-Mail in Australia.  In the United States, he was a contributing editor  at The Weekly Standard, and is a contributing editor for the American Interest.  He is Director of Economic Policy Studies at the Hudson Institute.
Stelzer is a consultant on market strategy, pricing and antitrust issues, and regulatory matters for U.S. and United Kingdom industries.
He is also an occasional contributor to The Guardian, the Daily Telegraph, Standpoint and the New Statesman. He resides in the United States. Some British politicians and newspapers have vilified Stelzer as Rupert Murdoch's right-hand man, an assertion that Stelzer denies.

Academic career
Stelzer received both his BA degree and his MA degree from New York University. At Cornell University he earned a Ph.D. in economics.  He has had teaching appointments at Cornell University, the University of Connecticut, and New York University and he has also been a teaching member of Columbia University’s Continuing Legal Education Programs. He has been elected a Visiting Fellow at Nuffield College, Oxford. He is a former member of the Litigation and Administrative Practice Faculty of the Practising Law Institute. He served on the Massachusetts Institute of Technology Visiting Committee for the Department of Economics.

Professional career
Stelzer co-founded National Economic Research Associates, Inc. (NERA) and served as its president from 1961 to 1983. NERA was sold to Marsh & McLennan Companies, Inc. (MMC) in 1983 and later became NERA Economic Consulting. Stelzer has served as a managing director of the investment banking firm of Rothschild Asset Management Inc. (U.S.) part of N M Rothschild & Sons. He also has served as a director of the Energy and Environmental Policy Center at Harvard University.
He is a signatory of the Henry Jackson Society, a senior director and fellow of the Hudson Institute and has edited and introduced a book on neoconservatism. He is a visiting fellow of Nuffield College, Oxford.  Prior to joining the Hudson Institute in 1998, Dr. Stelzer was resident scholar and director of regulatory policy studies at the American Enterprise Institute.  He started out by delivering flowers for "25 cents a shot"

Memberships and affiliations
 Visiting Committee, The Harris School of Public Policy Studies, The University of Chicago
 Member, Publication Committee, The Public Interest
 Member, Board, Regulatory Policy Institute (Oxford)
 Member, Advisory Board of The American Antitrust Institute
 Advisor to the U.S. Trade Representative
 Cosmos Club, Metropolitan Club, Reform Club

Publications
Stelzer has written and lectured on economic and policy development in the United States and the United Kingdom. He has written extensively on policy issues such as America’s competitive position in the world economy, optimum regulatory policies, the consequences of European integration, and factors affecting and impeding economic growth. He has served as economics editor of the Antitrust Bulletin
 
 
 
 
 
 
 
 
 
 
 
 
 
 
 
 
 
 
 
 
 
 
 
 
 
 
 
 
 
 
 Carbon Taxes: An opportunity for Conservatives, Washington: Hudson Institute, 2011.
 “Antitrust and the Hospitals”, National Affairs, Number 5, Fall 2015
 Later publications, sorted by topic, are available on the web site, www.irwinstelzer.com

References

Further reading

External links

 
 Biography, Articles and Publications at the Hudson Institute
 Profile at SourceWatch
 Video of lecture given at Edinburgh University in 2002 on Adam Smith
 
 

1932 births
American columnists
American economists
Cornell University alumni
Hudson Institute
Living people
The Weekly Standard people